"Lips to Lips" is a short story written in Russian by Vladimir Nabokov in Berlin in or about 1931. It was first published in 1956 as part of the collection Vesna v Fialte. After its translation into English by the author and his son it was first published in Esquire in 1971 and then in the collection A Russian Beauty and Other Stories in 1971.

Plot summary 
The Russian émigré writer Ilya Borisovich Tal is struggling with his love story Lips to Lips about an elderly man and a young woman. He gets advice from his friend Euphratski who suggests to send "your thing" as a serial to Arion, an émigré magazine. The editor lavishes Tal with praise and indicates they "would have been" happy to publish it. Euphratski explains that some money needs to be supplied to support further publications of the magazine, and Tal obliges. The first chapter gets published as a "prologue to a novel" under the pen name "A. Ilyin" although Tal had requested the pen name "I(lya) Annenski" (not being aware that Annensky was a famous Russian writer). Nevertheless, he is extremely proud and happy about his success, although behind his back, people snicker. When he has a chance to meet the editor, he overhears a conversation where the editor defends accepting the article; it is of "hopeless mediocrity" and was only accepted because of the money. Tal is shattered at first, but recovers in the hope that he might publish more, and will be "fully recognized after his death".

Comments 
In an ironical twist Nabobov's satire about the trials of the émigré writer was - while accepted for publication in 1931 or 32 - not printed at that time because the magazine went out of business. Thus, it had to wait a quarter century for its appearance. Nabokov remarked that by then everybody who might have resembled anybody in the story was "safely and heirlessly dead".

Short stories by Vladimir Nabokov
1930 short stories